James Stapleton Roy (born June 16, 1935) is a former senior United States diplomat specializing in Asian affairs. A fluent Chinese speaker, Roy spent much of his career in East Asia, where his assignments included Bangkok (twice), Hong Kong, Taipei, Beijing (twice), Singapore, and Jakarta. He also specialized in Soviet affairs and served in Moscow at the height of the Cold War. Ambassador Roy served as Assistant Secretary of State for Intelligence and Research from 1999 to 2000.

Early life and education
Roy was born in Nanking, China, where his father, Andrew Tod Roy, was a Presbyterian missionary and teacher who stayed on in China until he was denounced by the new government and expelled in 1951. His brother was David Tod Roy, a noted scholar and translator of Chinese literature. While in Shanghai, he attended Shanghai American School (SAS), but left China and SAS when the school was closed in 1949 following the Communist takeover of Shanghai. He attended Mount Hermon School (now Northfield Mount Hermon) and Princeton University, where he was elected to Phi Beta Kappa and graduated magna cum laude with an A.B. in history in 1956 after completing a senior thesis titled "The Revisionists and the Coming of the War to America."

Career

Roy rose to become a three-time ambassador, serving as the top U.S. envoy in Singapore (1984–86), the People's Republic of China (1991–95), and Indonesia (1996–99). In 1996, he was promoted to the rank of career ambassador, the highest rank in the United States Foreign Service.

Roy was Vice Chairman of Kissinger Associates, Inc., Chairman of the Hopkins-Nanjing Advisory Council established to assist Hopkins' in its partnership with Nanjing University that jointly manages the Hopkins-Nanjing Center (a graduate degree granting institution on the Nanjing University campus in Nanjing, China), and a director of ConocoPhillips and Freeport-McMoRan Copper & Gold, Inc. He is also a trustee of the Carnegie Endowment for International Peace and Co-Chair of The United States - Indonesia Society (USINDO).

In August 2008, Roy was named director of the Kissinger Institute for Chinese-U.S. Studies at the Woodrow Wilson International Center for Scholars. He sits on the advisory board for Washington, D.C.-based non-profit America Abroad Media.

Every spring since 2014, The J Stapleton Roy Award is awarded to two upperclassmen who embody a passion for social sciences, exhibited in and outside the classroom, throughout their SASPX career.  Recent award winners include Victor Vogelsang and Shelly Huang(2018), Donna Qi and Matthew Song(2019) and Harmony Wang and Teresa Shao (2022).

In remarks at Pomona College in September 2020, he "claimed that the 1989 Tiananmen Square protests and the Hong Kong protests of 2019 “went too far,” while also denying that China [was] engaged in a genocide of Uyghur Muslims in Xinjiang province."

In July 2022, Roy helped found a group of U.S. business and policy leaders who share the goal of constructively engaging with China in order to improve U.S.-China relations.

See also 
 Timeline of United States and China relations 1995-1997

References

External links

 Video and text of an April 2007 lecture by J. Stapleton Roy

1935 births
Ambassadors of the United States to Indonesia
Living people
ConocoPhillips people
Ambassadors of the United States to China
United States Career Ambassadors
United States Assistant Secretaries of State
Princeton University alumni
American expatriates in China
Assistant Secretaries of State for Intelligence and Research
Children of American missionaries in China
Northfield Mount Hermon School alumni
United States Foreign Service personnel